Dirk Brinkmann (born 2 October 1964) is a former West German field hockey player who competed at two Summer Olympics. On both occasions he won the silver medal with his team at the 1984 Summer Olympics and 1988 Summer Olympics. He was born in Duisburg, Nordrhein-Westfalen.

References
 sports-reference

External links
 

1964 births
Living people
German male field hockey players
Olympic field hockey players of West Germany
Olympic silver medalists for West Germany
Field hockey players at the 1984 Summer Olympics
Field hockey players at the 1988 Summer Olympics
Sportspeople from Duisburg
Olympic medalists in field hockey
Medalists at the 1984 Summer Olympics
Medalists at the 1988 Summer Olympics